Events from the year 1880 in Taiwan, Qing Dynasty.

Incumbents
 Emperor – Guangxu Emperor

Births
 21 May – Mona Rudao, Seediq chief

Deaths

 
Years of the 19th century in Taiwan